A list of films produced by the Tollywood (Bengali language film industry) based in Kolkata in the year 1993.

A-Z of films

References

External links
 Tollywood films of 1993 at the Internet Movie Database

1993
Lists of 1993 films by country or language
 Bengali
1993 in Indian cinema